Deborah Kafoury (born August 19, 1967) is a politician in the U.S. state of Oregon.

Born in Walla Walla, Washington, Kafoury received her bachelor's degree from Whitman College. She is the chair of the Multnomah County Commission, where she succeeded Jeff Cogen. She previously held a seat on the commission, which she resigned in October 2013 in order to run for chair in the May 2014 election. She noted her work on renovations to the Sellwood Bridge as something she would continue as chair.

Kafoury was a founder of the young-voter mobilization nonprofit X-PAC and served three terms in the Oregon House of Representatives, from 1999 to 2005, including a leadership role in the Democratic Party caucus.

She is the daughter of Stephen Kafoury and the late Gretchen Kafoury. She is also the first cousin of Trevor Kafoury, formerly the VP of commercial real estate brokerage CBRE in Portland, Oregon.

Multnomah County

In 2008, Kafoury was elected to the Multnomah County Commission. As a commissioner, she worked on efforts to replace the Sellwood Bridge and the Multnomah County Courthouse.

In October 2013, she resigned to run for chair, as required by the county charter. After receiving endorsements from several local newspapers, she was elected Multnomah County Chair on May 20, 2014. She took office June 5, 2014, and left it on December 31, 2022.

In response to the region's housing crisis, Kafoury established a Joint Office of Homeless Services in partnership with the City of Portland. The Joint Office consolidated a number of initiatives under one roof, allegedly focusing on programs such as short-term rental assistance to vulnerable people, transition out of shelter and into permanent housing, and increased capacity of Portland area shelters. Under Kafoury's tenure the Joint Office of Homeless Services used at least $2 million taxpayer dollars to purchase 22,700 tents and 69,514 tarps for the houseless.

At the December 21, 2017, Board of Commissioners meeting, she called fellow commissioner Loretta Smith a "bitch" after abruptly ending the meeting when Smith was asking questions.

In 2018, she and the Oregon Nurses Association attempted to get a $2 statewide increase on tobacco the state ballot. The petitioners failed to get enough votes to qualify the measure for the ballot.

References

External links
 Official office Web page

1967 births
Living people
Democratic Party members of the Oregon House of Representatives
Multnomah County Commissioners
Politicians from Walla Walla, Washington
Whitman College alumni
Women state legislators in Oregon
20th-century American politicians
20th-century American women politicians
21st-century American politicians
21st-century American women politicians